Mohebbi (also Romanized as Moḩebbī; also known as Maḥbī) is a village in Rudkhaneh Bar Rural District, Rudkhaneh District, Rudan County, Hormozgan Province, Iran. At the 2006 census, its population was 58, in 16 families.

References 

Populated places in Rudan County